RTV TK or Radio Televizija Tuzlanskog kantona is a Bosnian public television channel founded by Assembly of Tuzla Canton. Local public radio station Radio TK (together with Radio TK - Studio Srebrenica, Radio TK- Studio Banovići) is also part of this company. Headquarters of RTV TK is located in the City of Tuzla. The program is mainly produced in Bosnian language.

RTV TK is the regional broadcaster (founded in 1993) that has modern equipment for broadcasting radio and television programs, as well as audio and video production. TV program is currently broadcast 24h, estimated number of viewers population is about 966.567.  RTV TK is member of the Bosnian television network called TV1Mreža.

Mreža TV is a television program with almost national coverage in Bosnia and Herzegovina, and jointly in partnership with O Kanal broadcast several regional public and private TV stations. Mreža TV airs popular series, movies and sports programs to viewers in BiH.

Current line-up
This television channel broadcasts a variety of programs such as news, talk shows, documentaries, sports, movies, mosaic, children's programs, etc.

 TV  kalendar: Iz  dana u  dan - TV Calendar by RTV TK
 Vijesti (News) - broadcast at 07:05h, 12:00h and 22:30h
 Dnevnik 1 - news headlines at 16:00h
 Dnevnik 2 - news headlines at 19:00h
 Tribunal - Review of trials from International Criminal Tribunal for the former Yugoslavia 
 TV Liberty - TV magazine produced by Radio Free Europe/Radio Liberty services for Bosnia and Herzegovina
 Vijesti Glasa Amerike - VOA News in the Bosnian language
 Ljeto na dlanu - afternoon mosaic program (live)
 Sport 7- sports program
 1x2 - sports program
 Eko  sat - (Eco-hour) news program 
 Moj dom: savjeti (My home: tips) - shows about home decoration
 Džuboks -  (Jukebox) music program
 Naše priče - (Our stories) documentary program
 Pečat u vremenu - (Stamp in time) documentary program
 TV reportaža - (TV reportage) entertaining - documentary program
 Na  selu na  sijelu - (Hanging in the countryside) - documentary program
 Nedjeljni kolaž - (Sunday collage) - review of cultural events
 Hod vijekova - documentary program
 TV Razglednice - (TV Postcards) documentary program
 Obojeni svijet - Children's program
 Moj mali poni (My Little Pony: Friendship Is Magic) - cartoon program

References

External links
 www.rtvtk.ba (Official Website)
 Communications Regulatory Agency of Bosnia and Herzegovina

Mass media in Tuzla
Television stations in Bosnia and Herzegovina
Television channels and stations established in 1993